Payariq District is a district of Samarqand Region in Uzbekistan. Its capital is the city Payariq.

The district consists of two cities (Payariq, Chelak), 9 urban-type settlements (Tomoyrat, Qorasuv, Koʻksaroy, Gʻujumsoy, Xoʻja Ismoil, Tupolos, Oqqoʻrgʻon, Doʻstlarobod, Doʻstlik) and 11 rural communities.

References 

Samarqand Region
Districts of Uzbekistan